Svabhava (svabhāva; , sabhāva;) literally means "own-being" or "own-becoming". It is the intrinsic nature, essential nature or essence of beings.

The concept and term svabhāva are frequently encountered in Hindu and Buddhist traditions such as Advaita Vedanta (e.g. in the Avadhūta Gītā), Mahayana Buddhism (e.g. in the Ratnagotravibhāga), Vaishnavism (e.g., the writings of Ramanuja) and Dzogchen (e.g. in the seventeen tantras).

In the nondual Advaita Vedānta yoga text, Avadhūta Gītā, Brahman (in the Upanishadic denotation) is the svabhāva.

In the Mahāyāna Buddhadharma tradition(s) it is one of a suite of terms employed to denote the Buddha-nature, such as "gotra".

Indian philosophy

The term first appears in the Shvetashvatara Upanishad, as a possible first cause (jagatkāraṇa). There also seems to have been an Indian philosophical position called Svabhāvavada which was akin to naturalism which held that "things are as their nature makes them". It is possible this position was similar to or associated with Carvaka.

Samkhya
In early samkhya philosophy, Svabhava was a term which was associated with prakṛti. It is the inherent capacity of prakṛti, which is independent and self caused.

Vaishnavism
The Bhagavad Gītā (18.41) has nature (svabhava) as a distinguishing quality differentiating the varṇā.

Overzee (1992: p. 74) in her work on Pierre Teilhard de Chardin (1881–1955) and Rāmānuja (1017–1137) highlights Rāmānuja's usage of svabhāva in relation to Brahman thus:
Let us look more closely at what Rāmānuja means by the Lord's "nature". If you read his writings, you will find that he uses two distinct yet related words when referring to the nature of Brahman: svarūpa and svabhāva.

Buddhism

In early Theravādin texts, the term "svabhāva" did not carry the technical meaning or the soteriological weight of later writings. Much of Mahayana Buddhism (as in the Prajñāpāramitā Sūtra) denies outright that such a svabhāva exists within any being; however, while in the tathāgatagarbha sūtras, notably the Mahāyāna Mahāparinirvāṇa Sūtra, the Buddha states that the immortal and infinite Buddha-nature - or "true self" of the Buddha - is the indestructible svabhāva of beings, this position is clarified in the Śrīmālādevī Siṃhanāda Sūtra, which directly states that "tathāgatagarbha is not a substantial self, nor a living being, nor ‘fate,’ nor a person."

Theravāda
In the Pāli Canon, sabhāva is absent from what are generally considered to be the earliest texts. When found in later texts (e.g., the paracanonical Milindapañha), it generically refers to state (of mind), character or truth.

In the post-canonical Abhidhamma literature, sabhāva is used to distinguish an irreducible, dependent, momentary phenomenon (dhamma) from a conventionally constructed object.  Thus, a collection of visual and tactile phenomena might be mentally constructed into what is conventionally referred to as a "table"; but, beyond its constituent elements, a construct such as "table" lacks intrinsic existence  (sabhāva).

According to Peter Harvey, svabhava in the Theravada Abhidhamma is something conditional and interdependent:

Vaibhāṣika 
The Vaibhāṣika school held that dharmas have a constant essence or inherent nature (svabhāva) which persists through past, present and future. The term was also identified as a unique mark or own characteristic (svalaksana) that differentiated a dharma and remained unchangeable throughout its existence. According to Vaibhāṣikas, svabhavas are those things that exist substantially (dravyasat) as opposed to those things which are made up of aggregations of dharmas and thus only have a nominal existence (prajñaptisat).

Madhyamaka
Robinson (1957: p. 300) in discussing the Buddhist logic of Nāgārjuna, states:

Dzogchen
Dzogchen upholds a view of niḥsvabhāva, refuting svabhāva using the same logic employed by Madhyamaka, a freedom from extremes demonstrated succinctly via catuṣkoṭi tetralemma. 

In the context of logical analysis, Dzogchen agrees with the view of madhyamaka as elucidated by Nāgārjuna, Chögyal Namkhai Norbu explains:

The Union of the Sun and Moon, one of the 'seventeen tantras of the esoteric instruction cycle' which are a suite of tantras known variously as: nyingtik, upadesha or menngagde within Dzogchen discourse, states:

Bonpo Dzogchen
Svabhāva is very important in the nontheistic theology of the Bonpo Great Perfection (Dzogchen) tradition where it is part of a technical language to render macrocosm and microcosm into nonduality, as Rossi (1999: p. 58) states:

The Mirror of the Mind of Samantabhadra
The term "svabhāva" is mentioned in six verses of the first chapter of the Avadhūta Gītā: 1.5, 1.6, 1.44, 1.54, 1.58, 1.76.

This extreme nondual yoga text shares a lot of common language with the extreme nondual yoga of Atiyoga (Dzogchen) and its standard Tibetan analogue rang-bzhin (Wylie) is employed in The Mirror of the Mind of Samantabhadra, one of the Seventeen Tantras of Atiyoga Upadesha.

Dzogchen strictly refutes the notion of "svabhāva", and so The Mirror of the Mind of Samantabhadra, states specifically that dharmakāya is non-arisen and natureless:

The following quotation from The Mirror of the Mind of Samantabhadra is drawn from the Lungi Terdzö:

Namkhai Norbu
Dzogchen teacher Namkhai Norbu (2001: p. 155) in discussing the view of the pratyekabuddhas states that:

See also 
 Ahamkara
 Atman (Buddhism)
 Chöd
 Mahayana
 Mindstream
 Sunyata
 Anatman (Hinduism)
 Substance theory

Notes

References

Sources 

 Gethin, R.M.L. (1992). The Buddhist Path to Awakening: A Study of the Bodhi-Pakkhiyā Dhammā. Leiden: E.J. Brill. .
 Y Karunadasa, (1996). The Dhamma Theory: Philosophical Cornerstone of the Abhidhamma (WH 412/413). Kandy: Buddhist Publication Society.  Retrieved 2008-06-30 from "BPS" (transcribed 2007) at 
 Red Pine (2004). The Heart Sutra. Emeryville, CA: Shoemaker & Hoard. .
 
 Rhys Davids, Caroline A. F. ([1900], 2003). Buddhist Manual of Psychological Ethics, of the Fourth Century B.C., Being a Translation, now made for the First Time, from the Original Pāli, of the First Book of the Abhidhamma-Piaka, entitled Dhamma- (Compendium of States or Phenomena). Whitefish, MT: Kessinger Publishing. .
 Rhys Davids, T.W. & William Stede (eds.) (1921–25). The Pali Text Society's Pali-English Dictionary. Chipstead: Pali Text Society.
 Walshe, Maurice (1987, 1995). The Long Discourses of the Buddha: A Translation of the Digha Nikaya. Boston: Wisdom Publications. .
 Williams, Paul (1989; repr. 2007). Mahayana Buddhism: The Doctrinal Foundations. London: Routledge. .
 Yamamoto, Kosho (tr.), Page, Tony (ed.) (1999–2000).The Mahayana Mahaparinirvana Sutra in 12 volumes. London: Nirvana Publications

External links
The Mahayana Mahaparinirvana Sutra and its teachings on the deathless Self of the Buddha

Mahayana
Theravada Buddhist philosophical concepts
Dzogchen
Madhyamaka